The Taifa of Baeza was a medieval taifa Moorish kingdom. It existed only from 1224 to 1226, when it fell to the Christian Kingdom of Castile.

List of Emirs

Bayasid dynasty

'Abd Allah al-Bayasi "El Baezano": 1224–1226

1226 disestablishments in Europe
States and territories established in 1224
Baeza
Baeza